Ratu Deve Toganivalu  (1864 – 21 February 1939) was a Fijian chief and politician. He was Roko Tui of Bua from 1909 until 1928 and a member of the Legislative Council between 1926 and 1938.

Biography
Born in 1864, Toganivalu started his career in 1880 as a clerk in Levuka. In 1888 he joined the civil service as a Native Tax Inspector. He later became the Governor's Matanivanua and a Native Stipendiary Magistrate. He resigned from the civil service in 1927.

On 1 January 1909 Toganivalu became Roko Tui of Bua, a role he held until being succeeded by his son George Toganivalu in 1928. During his tenure, Bua gained a reputation as being the best-run and most traditional province of the territory. He became a nominated member of the Legislative Council in 1926, and was awarded an Imperial Service Order in the 1928 Birthday Honours. He resigned from the Legislative Council in 1938 and was replaced by G.W. Lalabalavu. He died in February 1939.

References

1864 births
Fijian chiefs
Fijian civil servants
Members of the Legislative Council of Fiji
Companions of the Imperial Service Order
1939 deaths